Outlaws of Santa Fe is a 1944 American Western film directed by Howard Bretherton and written by Norman S. Hall. The film stars Don "Red" Barry, Helen Talbot, Wally Vernon, Twinkle Watts, Charles Morton and Herbert Heyes. The film was released on April 4, 1944, by Republic Pictures.

Plot

Cast  
Don "Red" Barry as Bob Conroy aka Bob Hackett
Helen Talbot as Ruth Gordon
Wally Vernon as Buckshot Peters
Twinkle Watts as Winky Gordon
Charles Morton as Jim Hackett
Herbert Heyes as Henry Jackson
Bud Geary as Steve
LeRoy Mason as Trigger McGurn
Kenne Duncan as Henchman Chuck
Nolan Leary as Mayor Ward
Walter Soderling as Judge Turner
Edmund Cobb as Marshal Billings
Frank McCarroll as Henchman Bill
Bob Kortman as Henchman Ed
Emmett Lynn as Saloon Drunk

References

External links 
 

1944 films
American Western (genre) films
1944 Western (genre) films
Republic Pictures films
Films directed by Howard Bretherton
American black-and-white films
1940s English-language films
1940s American films